Veenangeni  is a small village near Vadalur town, in Cuddalore district, in the state of Tamil Nadu, in India. Veenangeni is the gateway for entering into the village Mettukkuppam, where saint Vallalar Ramalinga Swamigal spent the end of his life.

External links
Google map— Vivekananda Polytechnic College, Seplanatham

Villages in Cuddalore district